Heard It in a Past Life is the debut studio album by American pop singer-songwriter Maggie Rogers, released on January 18, 2019, by Debay Sounds and Capitol Records. With help from its hit single "Light On" (2018), the album debuted at number two on the Billboard 200 chart and received mostly positive reviews from critics, eventually earning Rogers a Grammy Award nomination for Best New Artist.

Recording and production
Rogers worked on the album for two years, with Rostam Batmanglij, Greg Kurstin, and other high-profile musicians in producer roles. Rogers stated in an interview about the album that "there was so much change that happened so fast, I wasn't always sure how to make all this stuff feel like me. I was really overwhelmed for a while, and scared too."

Marketing and sales
The first two singles, "Alaska" and "On + Off", were previously released on Rogers' 2017 EP, Now That the Light Is Fading, followed by "Fallingwater", "Give a Little" and "Light On". "Light On" peaked at number one on Billboards Adult Alternative Songs chart, becoming her first number one song on any Billboard chart. "Light On" was ranked as the 13th best song of 2019 by Billboard.

Heard It in a Past Life was released on January 18, 2019, by Debay Sounds under exclusive license to Capitol Records. According to Rolling Stone, it "announced her as a major indie-pop force and catapulted her into a yearlong tour of sold-out theaters and massive clubs". It debuted at number two on the Billboard 200 in its first release week, and by April, it had sold 200,000 album-equivalent units. Since in 2019 release, the album has amassed more than 800 million streams on Spotify.

Critical reception

Heard It in a Past Life was met with generally positive reviews. At Metacritic, which assigns a normalised rating out of 100 to reviews from mainstream publications, the album received an average score of 71, based on 23 reviews. Tony Clayton-Lea of The Irish Times called it a "vibrant electro-pop collection", while USA Todays Maeve McDermott hailed it as one of 2019's best folk-pop albums, along with Weyes Blood's Titanic Rising. Q magazine found the album "thoughtfully constructed and often enchanting", and AllMusic's Heather Phares said Rogers "finds different ways to forge her own bright, assured version of pop" on a "strong debut".

Other reviewers were more critical. Both Laura Snapes of Pitchfork and Greg Kot of the Chicago Tribune believed much of the album was overproduced by high-profile co-producers to the detriment of Rogers' talents. Tom Hull said he "could see her developing into some kind of pop star, but may be too adult too early", giving the album a B-plus.

Heard It in a Past Life and "Light On" helped earn Rogers a Grammy Award nomination in the category of Best New Artist for the 62nd Annual Grammy Awards (2020).

Rankings

"N/A" indicates that the publication did not rank the works included in their year-end list.

Track listing
Track listing and credits adapted from Tidal.

  signifies an additional producer
  signifies a co-producer

PersonnelMusicians Maggie Rogers – vocals (all tracks), clapping (1), piano (3, 6), percussion (5, 10), programming (8), background vocals (9); drums, keyboards (12)
 Greg Kurstin – drums, keyboards (1–3, 5, 10, 12), bass (1, 3, 5, 10), guitar (1, 3, 5, 10, 12), synth bass (2, 12), piano (3, 5, 10, 12), percussion (10, 12)
 Doug Schadt – programming (4, 8)
 Kid Harpoon – acoustic guitar, bass guitar, drum programming, electric guitar, piano (5)
 Nicholas Das – programming (8)
 Rostam Batmanglij – 12-string acoustic guitar, background vocals, drum programming, piano, shaker, synthesizer programming (9)Technical'

 Emily Lazar – mastering (1–3, 5–7, 9–12)
 Serban Ghenea – mixing (1–3, 5, 7, 10–12)
 Tony Maserati – mixing (4, 8)
 Tom Elmhirst – mixing (6, 9)
 John Hanes – mix engineering (1–3, 5, 7, 10–12)
 Tyler Scott – mix engineering (4, 8)
 Zach Hancock – mix engineering (4, 8)
 Alex Pasco – engineering (1–3, 5, 10, 12)
 Greg Kurstin – engineering (1–3, 5, 10, 12)
 Julian Burg – engineering (1–3, 5, 10, 12)
 Doug Schadt – engineering (4)
 Zach Hancock – engineering (4)
 Chandler Harrod – engineering (6)
 Ethan Shumaker – engineering (7, 11)
 Jack Hallenbeck – engineering (7)
 Maggie Rogers – engineering (7)
 Nicholas Das – engineering (8)
 Rostam Batmanglij – engineering (9)
 Chris Allgood – mastering assistance (1–3, 5–7, 9, 11, 12)
 Brandon Bost – mixing assistance (9)
 Dalton Ricks – engineering assistance (9)
 Nick Rowe – engineering assistance (9)

Charts

Certifications

References

External links
 

2019 debut albums
Capitol Records albums
Maggie Rogers albums
Albums produced by Greg Kurstin
Albums produced by Rostam Batmanglij